The 2021 CEBL–U Sports Draft is the Third CEBL Draft, being revealed on April 14. Seven Canadian Elite Basketball League (CEBL) teams will select 21 athletes in total.

Format
the draft order for the first round is determine by how the teams finished in the 2020 CEBL season, Saskatchewan Rattlers finished last place last season so they get first overall. A "snake draft" was used, with the order reversing in even-numbered rounds, and the original order in odd-numbered rounds. The draft order for the first round was determined as follows:
 Saskatchewan Rattlers
 Niagara River Lions
 Guelph Knighthawks
 Ottawa BlackJacks
 Hamilton Honey Badgers
 Fraser Valley Bandits
 Edmonton Stingers

Eligibility
Players may completed their university eligibility in 2020-21, or they may be returning to their university team in the fall and be classified within the CEBL’s U SPORTS Developmental player program. They must qualify as Canadian, and they must have completed at least one full year of eligibility at their U SPORTS institution. Each CEBL club must have at least one U SPORTS player on its 10-man active roster at all times.

Player selection
Source:

Round 1

Round 2

Round 3

References

Canadian Elite Basketball League
2020–21 in Canadian basketball